Queen Elizabeth Sixth Form College, or QE as it is commonly known, is a sixth form college on Vane Terrace in Darlington, County Durham, England. It educates nearly 2000 students from Darlington and the surrounding areas with students coming from Stockton, Richmond, Newton Aycliffe and elsewhere. It is situated near the town centre, next to Stanhope Park.

History
It was established in 1970 on the site of the old Queen Elizabeth Grammar School, designed by George Gordon Hoskins. The original educational establishment was commissioned by Queen Elizabeth I, hence the name. Much of the building was refurbished following a fire in 1987 and on 17 April 1991, the Duchess of Kent opened the library. In 2004 a large extension was completed, the Trinity building, including a new sports hall, art department and atrium study area, increasing the capacity of students. In 2012 another extension was completed with the Stanhope building, designed to house creative arts and media, as well as a refurbishment of the library with more computer and study areas.

Admissions
Queen Elizabeth Sixth Form College is one of the most highly rated colleges in England and has almost 2000 students, mostly aged 16–18. It offers around 40 full-time AS and A level courses, some vocational courses and GCSEs, as well as several part-time evening classes. For most students the college requires that applicants have at least 6 GCSEs at grades A* to C to begin A level courses.

Academic performance
A level results for 2011 had over 99% pass rate and over 60% A*-B grades.

Alumni 
 Jane Kennedy, Labour MP for Liverpool Wavertree (1992–2010)
 Andrea Sutcliffe, chief executive of the Nursing and Midwifery Council (1980–2)
 Theo Hutchcraft, one half of synth-pop duo, Hurts
 Alex Cunningham, Labour MP for Stockton North (2010–present)
 Scarlett Moffatt, Reality star
 Robert Icke, Olivier award winning theatre director and writer
 Philippa Langley, discoverer of Richard III's body.

Queen Elizabeth Grammar School
 Vice Admiral Sir Robert Dixon, former President of the Institute of Marine Engineers (1878–85)
 Walter Dixon (1870–1931l), pharmacologist.
 Sir Eric Miller, industrialist (1893-1900)
 Bentley Beetham (1886–1963), mountaineer, ornithologist and photographer
 William Henderson, 1st Baron Henderson, Labour MP for Enfield from 1923–4 and 1929–31 (1902–09)
 Norman Creek (1909–14)
 Air Vice-Marshal Arthur Hutton CBE DFC (1912–19)
 Eric Neil (1918–1990), physiologist.
 Chapman Pincher, journalist (1925–32)
 Rear Admiral Thomas Cruddas CB, Comdr HMS Ark Royal from 1953–55 (1928–35)
 Sir Geoffrey Cass, chief executive of Cambridge University Press from 1972–92 (1933–40)
 Prof James Francis Tait, Joel Professor of Physics as Applied to Medicine from 1970–82 at University College London (1937–44)
 Angus Maddison, economist (1938–45)
 Prof David Daniell, Professor of English from 1992–4 at University College London (1940–7)
 Prof Cecil Kidd, Regius Professor of Physiology from 1984–97 at Marischal College, University of Aberdeen (1944–51)
 Aidan Chambers, children's novelist who wrote Postcards from No Man's Land (1946–53)
 Bernard Dixon OBE, science writer (1949–56)
 Ian Hamilton, poet (1949–56)
 Sir Alan Wilson, Vice-Chancellor from 1991–2004 of the University of Leeds (1950–7)
 Edward Pearce, political journalist, (1950–7)
 David Harker CBE, Chief Executive of Citizens Advice (1962–69)
 Stanley Baines Hamilton (1889–1977), civil engineer and historian.

See also
List of English and Welsh endowed schools (19th century)

References

External links
 College website
 Ofsted Report
 2005 League tables.
 EduBase

Learning and Skills Beacons
Education in the Borough of Darlington
Sixth form colleges in County Durham
Schools in Darlington
Educational institutions established in 1970
1970 establishments in England